Prioria pinnata is a species of legume in the family Fabaceae. The population has declined considerably because of overexploitation and habitat degradation. Regeneration appears to be very poor. It is found only in India. It is threatened by habitat loss.

References

Detarioideae
Flora of Karnataka
Flora of Kerala
Flora of Tamil Nadu
Endangered plants